The Mithrim Montes  are a range of mountains on Titan, the largest moon of the planet Saturn. The range is located near Titan's equator, between 1-3° south and 126-8° west  and consists of three parallel ridges that are oriented east-west, spaced about 25 km apart. They are located within the region Xanadu.

The Mithrim Montes are named after the Mithrim Mountains, a range in J. R. R. Tolkien's fictional world of Middle-earth. This follows a convention that Titanean mountains are named after mountains in Tolkien's work. The name was formally announced on November 13, 2012.

References

See also
List of tallest mountains in the Solar System

Mountain ranges
Surface features of Titan (moon)
Extraterrestrial surface features named for Middle-earth